Robert Walker Kenny (August 21, 1901 – July 20, 1976), 21st Attorney General of California (1943-1947), was "a colorful figure in state politics for many years" who in 1946 ran unsuccessfully against Earl Warren for state governor (a race in which Warren won both Republican and Democratic nominations).  In 1947, he led the defense of the Hollywood Ten.

Background

Robert Walker Kenny was born on August 21, 1901, in Los Angeles, California. His mother was Minnie Summerfield.  His father, Robert Wolfenden Kenny (1863-1914) was a successful banker and civic leader in Los Angeles and Berkeley, California. Kenny's grandfather, George L. Kenny, arrived in San Francisco in the early 1850s with his friends, the brothers A.L. Bancroft and Hubert Howe Bancroft. The three men formed a partnership and established the first bookstore in San Francisco.  In 1921, Kenny graduated at 18 from Stanford University.

Career

Press
In 1921, Kenny joined the Los Angeles Times, where he worked with Chapin Hall, and eventually became a financial editor there.  In 1922, he joined United Press news service.  He then worked for the Chicago Tribune in Paris.  In 1923, he returned to Los Angeles and worked for United News.  He then opened his own press service with Ted Taylor, called the Los Angeles Press Service, while also working the for the Los Angeles Express.  After studying law privately, in 1926 he passed a civil service examination and was admitted to the state bar.

California government service

In 1927, Kenny began working in the Los Angeles County counsel's office as "Deputy of the County Counsel."  In 1929, he joined the state legislature.  In 1930, Kenny supported James Rolph Jr., who became California governor, and received an appointment as judge to the Los Angeles Municipal Court, followed by promotion to the Los Angeles Superior Court.  In 1934, he won an election and became municipal judge for small claims court.  He then became a judge in the law and motion court.
At some time in the 1930s, Kenny became a Democrat.  He was an early advocate for civil rights in California. He restructured the California Department of Justice (DOJ) to be similar to the United States Department of Justice; for example, he transferred the California DOJ main office from San Francisco closer to the state legislature in Sacramento, and created civil service positions instead of political appointments within the California DOJ. He also was instrumental in abolishing the legal existence of the Ku Klux Klan in California.

Kenny also served as a Municipal Court Judge and later a Superior Court Judge in Los Angeles, California. He served in the California State Senate from 1939 to 1943.

Private practice
Kenny resigned his judgeship.  In 1939, he dissolved a law partnership with Paul Vallee and Lawrence Beilensen.  He set up a new partnership with Morris E. Cohen, which lasted until 1948.  Robert O. Curran joined the firm but left to fight in World War II; Robert S. Morris replaced him.

Clients included William Schneiderman, head of the California section of the Communist Party USA; Kenny helped him with citizenship papers in 1940, a case he lost but which Wendell Willkie helped win on appeal in 1943.

Attorney General of California
In 1942, Kenny was elected Attorney General of California, beating Louis H. Burke, and served one term to 1947. Under Kenny in this period, Robert B. Powers worked as "coordinator of law enforcement agencies".

In 1946, Kenny sought the Democratic nomination for Governor, but was defeated by Earl Warren.  Although Warren was a Republican, California law at that time permitted a candidate to run in both primaries, a practice known as cross-filing.  Warren also won the Republican nomination that year and went on to score an easy general election victory.

NLG, Hollywood Ten, and HUAC

In 1937, he supported Franklin Delano Roosevelt's attempt at "court-packing" of the United States Supreme Court in FDR's Judicial Procedures Reform Bill of 1937.

"Out of that battle grew the National Lawyers Guild" (NLG), wrote the New York Times in 1976 at Kenny's death.  On February 22, 1937, when the NLG formed, Kenny was a founding member.  In 1940, Kenny became national resident of the NLG through 1948. As NLG state president, he became involved in the aftermath of the Zoot Suit Riots.  (Kenny was also a member of the NLG's predecessor, the International Juridical Association.)

In May 1945, while still attorney general Kenny accompanied Bartley Crum and Martin Popper to the founding session of the United Nations in San Francisco, where they appeared as National Lawyer Guild "official' consultants to the American delegation at the behest of the United States Department of State. In 1946, Kenny returned to private practice. In 1947, NLG members Charles Katz and Ben Margolis asked Kenny to become lead counsel and Crum his second for the "Unfriendly Nineteen" subpoenaed to testify before the House Un-American Activities Committee (HUAC) in October 1947.  Later, NLG members Martin Popper of Washington and constitutional Sam Rosenwein of New York supported the team.  Only ten people wound up testifying, all cited for contempt of Congress, and so became the Hollywood Ten.

Later life
In 1948, Kenny and Robert S. Morris formed a new law partnership.  In the 1940s and 1950s, they represented "many people under indictment for questionable activities."  Clients included Luisa Moreno Bemis, Guatemalan labor activist, many "unfriendly" witnesses (including the Hollywood Ten) before HUAC in Los Angeles in 1952, as well as musicians before HUAC in 1956. Kenny was a member of the American Committee for the Protection of Foreign Born.  Partner Robert S. Morris was a member of the Immigration and Deportation Committee in the Los Angeles chapter of the American Civil Liberties Union (ACLU).

In 1950, Kenny ran for California state senator against Glenn Anderson and Jack Tenney for the Democratic nomination; Tenney won.  The same year, he ran for Los Angeles mayor; Fletcher Bowron won in a recall. In 1957, he was one of the lawyers who helped 23 Hollywood screenwriters and actors win a Supreme Court review of their challenge of the Hollywood blacklist.
In 1960, Kenny was treasurer of the National Committee to Abolish the House Un-American Activities Committee (NCA-HUAC). In 1962, Kenny served as counsel of Albert J. Lewis and Steve Roberts of the Fair Play for Cuba Committee before HUAC.

In 1963, the Congressional Record re-recorded information from October 26, 1955, that "public records, files, and publications of this committee" (HUAC) showed Kenny "not necessarily a Communist, a Communist sympathizer, or a fellow traveller" but noted nevertheless that he was affiliated with the American Youth for Democracy, Civil Rights Congress, Joint Anti-Fascist Refugee Committee, and California Labor School. In 1966, California Governor Edmund G. Brown appointed Kenny again a state judge.  In 1975, he retired from the bench.

Personal life and death

In 1922, Kenny married Sara McCann; she died in 1966.

In the 1930s, Kenny was a "liberal Republican."

Robert Walter Kenny died age 74 on July 20, 1976, at Scripps Memorial Hospital in La Jolla, California with no survivors.

Legacy

In 2012, the National Lawyers Guild remembered Kenny as follows:      That the Guild survived the splits in the late '30s and repression of the '50s is primarily a testament to the loyalty, bravery and commitment to principle of two allied but disparate groups. One was made up of communist and socialist activists... The other was a group of dedicated civil libertarians who were unwilling to compromise their principles to curry favor with either the Roosevelt Administration or the Truman and Eisenhower Administrations. Nor would they refuse to work with Communists. But these lawyers were not communists, and steered the Guild in an independent, radical direction. Robert W Kenny, a California State Senator who became President of the Guild in 1940 at a moment of grave internal crisis, disregarding the risks to his political future, and remaining President for eight important years, was a key member of this group.

Works

 The Law of Freedom in a Platform by Gerrard Winstanley, edited by Robert W. Kenny (1973)

See also

 California Attorney General
 National Lawyers Guild
 Hollywood blacklist
 Hollywood Ten
 Bartley Crum
 William Schneiderman

References

External links
 Critical Past - Kenny and Crum ask HUAC to stop hearings (1947)
Guide to the Robert Walker Kenny Papers at The Bancroft Library
Kenny biography from  State of California Department of Justice Office of the Attorney General
Robert Walker Kenny Papers, The Bancroft Library
 Photo of William E. MacFaden and Robert W. Kenny (1934)
 Stanford University: Warner v. Kenny
 Library of Congress:  Kenny, Robert W. (Robert Walker), 1901-1976
 Image of Zola Vredenburgh watching Judge Robert Kenny playing chess against Judge Wilbur Curtis, Los Angeles, 1934. Los Angeles Times Photographic Archive (Collection 1429). UCLA Library Special Collections, Charles E. Young Research Library, University of California, Los Angeles.
 Robert W. Kenny

Democratic Party California state senators
California state court judges
California Attorneys General
1901 births
1976 deaths
20th-century American judges
20th-century American politicians
Stanford University alumni